Balança is a Portuguese freguesia ("civil parish"), located in the municipality of Terras de Bouro in the district of Braga. The population in 2011 was 307, in an area of 4.45 km2.

References 

Parishes of Terras de Bouro